
Bistro Chez Jacques is a defunct restaurant in Maastricht, Netherlands. It was a fine dining restaurant that was awarded one Michelin star in 1976 and retained that rating until 1979.

Its owner and head chef was Jacques Zeguers.

In January 1973, Zeguers was offered a brown bear for his restaurant. Zeguers accepted the bear and served it. Self-styled animal protector and arms dealer Pistolen Paultje (officially Paul Wilking) was not happy with that and threatened to thrash the restaurant when he dared to serve a second bear.

See also
List of Michelin starred restaurants in the Netherlands

References 

Restaurants in Maastricht
Restaurants in the Netherlands
Michelin Guide starred restaurants in the Netherlands
Defunct restaurants in the Netherlands